Kfeir Yabous is a Syrian village in the Qudsaya District of the Rif Dimashq Governorate. According to the Syria Central Bureau of Statistics (CBS), Kfeir Yabous had a population of 3,801 in the 2004 census.

References

External links

Populated places in Qudsaya District